Gavin Urquhart (born 18 May 1988) is an Australian rules football player, who last played for North Melbourne Football Club.

Urquhart was the 21st pick in the 2006 AFL Draft, and made his senior debut on 31 May 2008, in round 10. Urquhart received a Rising Star nomination after his round 18 performance against Brisbane, when he had 22 possessions. Urquhart signed a two-year deal with North Melbourne in August 2008.

The 2010 season was a poor one for Urquhart, as he struggled to overcome niggling injuries, and he could only manage eight senior games. During trade week, rumours surfaced that North Melbourne were going to trade Urquart, but Kangaroos coach Brad Scott dismissed the rumours only days later, declaring that "he's a required player".

At the end of the 2012 season, Urquhart was delisted by the Kangaroos.  Subsequently, in 2014 he signed with Essendon District Football League team Airport West.

References

External links 

1988 births
Living people
North Melbourne Football Club players
Morningside Australian Football Club players
Australian rules footballers from Queensland
North Ballarat Football Club players